After the Rain is a jazz album by John McLaughlin, released in 1995 on Verve Records. The album reached number 9 in the Billboard Top Jazz Albums chart 1995. It features organist Joey DeFrancesco and veteran drummer Elvin Jones.

Track listing 

 "Take the Coltrane" (Duke Ellington) – 6:01 		
 "My Favorite Things" (Oscar Hammerstein II, Richard Rodgers) – 6:16 		
 "Sing Me Softly of the Blues" (Carla Bley) – 6:31 		
 "Encuentros" (Gato Barbieri, John McLaughlin) – 7:32 		
 "Naima" (John Coltrane) – 4:43 		
 "Tones for Elvin Jones" (John McLaughlin) – 6:34 		
 "Crescent" (John Coltrane) – 7:41 		
 "Afro Blue" (Mongo Santamaría) – 6:54 		
 "After the Rain" (John Coltrane) – 4:54

Personnel 
Musicians
 John McLaughlin – guitar
 Joey DeFrancesco – Hammond organ
 Elvin Jones – drums

Production
 Jean-Philippe Allard - executive producer
 J.L. Barilla - design
 Max Costa - mastering, mixing
 Arthur Elgort - photography
 Cheung Ching Ming – photography
 Jonathan Mooney – assistant engineer
 Ed Rak – engineer
 Michael Stein – production coordination

Chart performance

References 

1995 albums
John McLaughlin (musician) albums
Verve Records albums